John Lewis (21 November 1867 – 19 September 1939) was an Australian cricketer. He played in eighteen first-class matches for Queensland between 1894 and 1912.

See also
 List of Queensland first-class cricketers

References

External links
 

1867 births
1939 deaths
Australian cricketers
Queensland cricketers
Cricketers from Brisbane